Vagamon is an Indian hill station and a revenue village primarily located in Peerumedu taluk of Idukki district (majority area including Vagamon town), and also Meenachil taluk and Kanjirappally taluk of Kottayam district in the state of Kerala, India.

History
Vagamon does not have a long history to boast of as it remained unexplored for centuries. Though the British had plantations here, it was only in 1926, when Walter Duncan and Company started their tea plantations, that it became well-known. In the 1930s, more tea plantations were set up in the area. After 1940 people from Travancore, mostly from southern Travancore, and people from Madras (Tamil Nadu), migrated to Vagamon. Later, after the formation of Kerala State, people from various parts of Kerala migrated there.

In the 1950s, the famed Kurisumala Ashram was set up here and that was the turning point in its development into a well-known place.

National Geographic Traveler has listed Vagamon on their directory of the "50 most attractive places to visit in India".

Demographics
As of 2011 Census, Vagamon had a population of 14,641 with 7,212 males and 7,429 females. The average sex ratio was 1030 lower than the state average of 1084. In Vagamon, 9% of the population was under 6 years of age. Vagamon had an average literacy of 90.9% higher than the national average of 74%, and lower than the state average of 94%.

Education
DC School of Management and Technology (DCSMAT) and DC School Of Architecture And Design are the two institutions, promoted by DC Kizhakemuri Foundation and co-promoted by DC Books, located in Pullikkanam near Vagamon. DCSMAT, one of the leading management colleges in Kerala, has two campuses located in Thiruvananthapuram and Vagamon. DCSMAT offer programs such as Master of Business Administration (MBA), Bachelor of Commerce (B.Com), Bachelor of Business Administrati (BBA), Certified Management Accountant (CMA) and Association of Chartered Certified Accountants (ACCA). DC School Of Architecture And Design provides courses such as Bachelor of Arts in Interior Design (BA Interior Design) and Bachelor of Architecture (BArch). The College of Dairy Sciences kolahalamedu Vagamon, offering courses for the B Tech Dairy Sciences, affiliated to Veterinary University.

Issues 
In August 2008, the Kerala Police said it had begun investigations two months back into a training camp organized in December 2007 by the banned SIMI activists.

On 18 August 2014, two tourists from Kozhikode died in Vagamon, after lightning struck them. Others who were with them sustained minor injuries.
The incident happened at around 4:30 PM when the tourists were hanging around the barren hilltops. Both fell after the lightning hit them and their dresses had burnt out. Though both were taken to hospital, they died by the time they arrived.

Biodiversity
Vagamon, due to its elevation and climate, has a unique ecosystem, leading to the emergence of rich natural vegetation, plant species, shola forests etc. From the early 20th century plantation crops like tea, coffee started. Vagamon hills are home to less explored flora and fauna. A faunal diversity study conducted by Dr Pratheesh Mathew recorded 112 species of moths from 16 families under eight superfamilies and has become the prominent faunal diversity study in this area. The author has also recorded sightings of many species of insects, annelids, amphibians, lizards, snakes, birds and mammals. A wide variety of flowering and non-flowering plants, including rare Cycas species, has also been noted. The ongoing faunal and floral surveys are expected to shed light on the richness of biodiversity at this location. The flourishing tourism and related developments are predicted to have a negative impact on the flora and fauna of this region.

Religion
In Vagamon there are Hindu, Christian and Muslim populations.
Kurisumala, Vagamon, most prominent Christian pilgrim center.
Thangal para Dargha sheriff, Vagamon
Sree Arundhathi Vasishta Temple, Vasishtagiry, Vagamon.
Sree Subramanya Swami Temple Vagamon
St Sebastian's RC Church Vagamon
St Antony's Church Vagamon
Emmanuel CSI Church Vagamon

Notable people
K Radhakrishnan (former speaker and Minister of the Kerala Assembly)

Books
 The Story of Peermade by George Thengummoottil

Gallery

See also

References

Hill stations in Kerala
Populated places in the Western Ghats
Villages in Kottayam district
Paragliding in India
Geography of Kottayam district
Tourist attractions in Kottayam district
Tourism in Kerala
Tourism in Idukki district